Hayford is a lunar impact crater on the Moon's far side. It is a relatively isolated feature with the nearest named crater being Krasovskiy, some 300 km due south. Hayford has a well-defined edge that is not significantly eroded. The inner walls slope directly down to the floor, with little slumping or terrace formation. The interior floor is relatively featureless.

Satellite craters
By convention these features are identified on lunar maps by placing the letter on the side of the crater midpoint that is closest to Hayford.

References

 
 
 
 
 
 
 
 
 
 
 
 

Impact craters on the Moon